Adyapeath Annada Polytechnic College is a government-sponsored polytechnic located in Dakshineshwar, North 24 Parganas district, West Bengal. This polytechnic is affiliated with the West Bengal State Council of Technical & Vocational Education and Skill Development, and recognised by the All India Council for Technical Education. The college offers diploma (polytechnic) courses in electrical, mechanical, and civil engineering.

Admission procedure
A willing student passed tenth board exam with minimum 35% in aggregate and has subjects English, science/physical science, and mathematics from a recognized board can apply to Jexpo (Joint Entrance Examination for Polytechnic West Bengal) entrance exam. By securing relevant rank and going though official counselling procedure, willing Student can admit to the institute for three years diploma course.
Students qualified class 12th exam from any West Bengal State Council of Technical and Vocational Education and Skill Development (Vocational Education Division) or two years ITI after the Madhyamik or equivalent exam are eligible to apply for the Vocational Lateral Entry Test entrance exam. After securing a relevant rank and going though the official counselling process, the willing Student can admit to the institute for two years diploma course (Lateral Entry).

Fee structure
Adyapeath Annada Polytechnic College is a government sponsored polytechnic college. The fee structure of the college is same as the other government and government sponsored polytechnic colleges in West Bengal.

Campus location
The college is located at the northern fringes of city Kolkata.It is located in Dakshineswar. The college campus is situated within the Adyapeath temple premises. The address is 50, DD Mondal Ghat Rd, Dakshineswar, Kolkata, West Bengal-700076.

The nearest railway station is Dakshineswar Railway Station, the nearest metro station is Dakshineswar metro station and Baranagar metro station. The nearest bus stand is Dakshineswar Bus Terminus and Ariadaha Bus Terminus.

Hostel facilities
The college has hostels for both boys and girls, which is running under the Dakshineswar Ramkrishna Sangha Adyapeath(The Adyapeath Temple Authority). The food is also provided in the hostel. The hostel fee structure is determined by the Temple Authority. The college does not have government funded hostel.

References

External links
  

Universities and colleges in North 24 Parganas district
Technical universities and colleges in West Bengal
2016 establishments in West Bengal
Educational institutions established in 2016